Vila is a village in Andorra, located in the parish of Encamp. 

Populated places in Andorra
Encamp